Ian Michael Howfield (born June 4, 1966) is a former American football placekicker who played in the National Football League (NFL) and Arena Football League (AFL). Howfield, who played college football at the University of Tennessee, is the son of former NFL placekicker Bobby Howfield.

Howfield played six years in the National Football League as a placekicker: Miami Dolphins in 1987, Seattle Seahawks from 1988–1989 (signed to the practice squad for both years), Denver Broncos in 1990, Houston Oilers in 1990–1991, Philadelphia Eagles in 1992 and Tampa Bay Buccaneers in 1993. He led the Oilers in scoring in 1991.

Early life and college career
Howfield graduated from Columbine High School 1984, then attended Midwestern State University in Wichita Falls, Texas from 1984 to 1985 on a Soccer Scholarship.  He transferred to the University of Tennessee in 1986 to begin his placekicking career, graduating in 1988.

Professional career

National Football League
Howfield tried out with several NFL Teams before making the final roster with the Houston Oilers. In August 1991, Howfield eventually beat out Teddy Garcia and Raul Allegre for the Oilers' kicking position after making all three field goal attempts (38, 54, 29 yards) in his preseason debut against the Dallas Cowboys. Howfield signed practice squad contracts with the Seattle Seahawks Philadelphia Eagles and Tampa Bay Buccaneers.  Howfield went on to a very successful Arena League career breaking several long time records during his 7 years in the AFL. Howfield suffered serious lower back and right knee injuries that required immediate surgery in car accident in Las Vegas. A construction truck sideswiped the car he was traveling in. These injuries ended his kicking career.

Arena Football League
In 1993, Howfield joined the Dallas Texans of the Arena Football League, where he was 7 for 27 (25.9%) in field goals and 19 for  23 (82.6%) in extra points. He moved to the Fort Worth Cavalry in 1995, where he made 10 of 29 (34.5%) field goals and 40 of 53 (75.5%) extra points.

1995 saw his first full season in the AFL with the Las Vegas Sting, during which he led the league in scoring for kickers with 120 points, a then-league-record field goal percentage at 71.4 (20 of 28), field goals made (20), extra point percentage (91 percent), and longest field goal (61 yards against the Miami Hooters). He was named Micatin Arena League Kicker of the Year and Second-team All-Arena for his season.

He joined the Anaheim Piranhas in 1996, where he went 21 for 43 (48.8%) in field goals and 63 for 73 (86.3%) in extra points. In 1996, he led the league in field goals made with 21 and was second in FG percentage at 48.8. The following year, he had a league-best 21 field goals made with a 47.7 conversion percentage, along with 62 for 74 on extra points.
 
Howfield was in a life-threatening car accident that cut his career short at the end of the 1997 season in Las Vegas. He received two disk fusions in his lower back and an entire right knee cartilage replacement, and was out of football for five years recovering from the injuries (1998 to 2002).
 He made a comeback in 2003 with the Tampa Bay Storm. In his first game back from the car accident, he made all three field goals. Howfield moved to the New York Dragons later that year, and concluded the season with a league-best 66.6 conversion percentage (10 of 15), followed by a 31-yard game winner in the playoffs as time expired to advance to the quarterfinals.

He retired at the end of the 2003 season, but came back in 2004 with the Las Vegas Gladiators, where he played four games to fill in for injured kickers. He was three for five (60%) in field goals and 18 for 21 (85.7) in extra points.

At the time of his final retirement, he held various league and team records and stats:

 All-time 2-point drop kicks: 5th (2)
 All-time field goal percentage: 15th (49%)
 All-time field goal percentage in a season: 7th in 1995 with 71.4% (20 of 28). Arena League record at the time, lasted 9 years
 8th 2005 with 66.7 (10 of 15)
 All-time career field goal percentage: 15th (48.9%)
 All-time field goals made: 9th (92)
 4th longest field goal ever made: 61 yards
 8th all time in kicking points: 614
 Tampa Bay Storm franchise record for longest playoff field goal: 47 yards
 Tampa Bay Storm franchise record for field goals made in the playoffs: 2

References

Living people
1966 births
Houston Oilers players
Tennessee Volunteers football players
American football placekickers
Dallas Texans (Arena) players
Fort Worth Cavalry players
Las Vegas Sting players
Anaheim Piranhas players
New York Dragons players
Tampa Bay Storm players
Las Vegas Gladiators players
Miami Dolphins players
Seattle Seahawks players
Denver Broncos players
Philadelphia Eagles players
Tampa Bay Buccaneers players
 American people of English descent